The list of cities with most skyscrapers ranks cities around the world by their number of skyscrapers.
Historically, the term first referred to buildings with 10 to 20 floors in the 1880s. The definition shifted with advancing construction technology during the 20th century which allowed for taller buildings to be constructed.

List of cities by number of completed skyscrapers taller than 

List of cities by number of skyscrapers under construction taller than 

Cities with at least 50 skyscrapers above 150m 
Included in this chart are cities with skyscrapers of known heights that are completed or under construction.

Cities with at least 1 skyscraper above 300m 
This is a list which ranks cities with at least 1 skyscraper (under construction and on-hold inclusive) above 300m (i.e. about 75–80 floors).

Cities with at least 1 completed skyscraper above 300m 
This is a list which ranks cities with at least 1 skyscraper (Architecturally Topped Out inclusive) above 300m (i.e. about 75–80 floors).

Notes
 Greater Taipei is a metropolitan city, which includes Taipei City and New Taipei. The metropolis encompasses an area of 1,140 square kilometers, which is more comparable to the areas covered by other cities on the list such as Suzhou, Wuhan, and Barcelona. This is not to be confused with Taipei City which is only 271.80 square kilometers and is the downtown core that governs the whole metropolis, like the City of London and Greater London all contained by London. Also, in terms of population, Greater Taipei has a population of 7,034,084 as of 2019, which is more comparable to other cities in the list such as Hong Kong, Hangzhou, Madrid and Kuala Lumpur; whereas Taipei City only has a population of 2,480,681 in 2022.
  Manila is a metropolitan city composed of 17 administrative areas (16 cities and 1 municipality) also known as Metro Manila making it one of the largest megacities in the world. Formally called the National Capital Region, the city encompasses an area of 613.14 square kilometers, which is comparable to the areas covered by other cities on the list such as Seoul, Singapore, and Mumbai. This is not to be confused with the City of Manila which is only 42.88 square kilometers and is the historic core that formerly governed the whole metropolis, like the City of London in London. Its number of completed skyscrapers is 115 as of January 2021) currently at 8th place in world ranking.
Metro Vancouver is a metropolitan city and a regional district composed of 23 municipalities. The area is also known as Greater Vancouver. The city encompasses an area of 2,882.68 km2, comparable to the areas of other cities included on this list such as Moscow, Hanoi, and Tokyo. This is not to be confused with the City of Vancouver, which is only 115 square kilometers and contains the central business district of the city. Also population wise, the City of Vancouver only has a population of 675,218, compared with the more metropolitan figure of 2,737,698 in Metro Vancouver. Due to building height restrictions, the majority of Metro Vancouver's skyscrapers are situated in the municipality of Burnaby, which is also where the administrative offices of Metro Vancouver are located. As of May 2022, Metro Vancouver contains 15 completed and topped out skyscrapers and 8 under construction. 
 Gush Dan, or Greater Tel Aviv, is a metropolitan area that includes over 40 municipalities. It covers an area of 1,516 square kilometers, comparable to the areas covered by other cities on the list. This is not to be confused with Tel Aviv-Yafo, which is only 52 square kilometers in size, housing about 450,000 residents, and constitutes the core of the metropolis. Cities in the metropolitan containing skyscrapers are: Tel Aviv-Yafo, Ramat Gan, Bnei Brak, Ashdod, Bat Yam, Petah Tikva and Givatayim.

References

External links
Skyscrapercenter.com
CTBUH.com
Emporis.com
Skyscraperpage.com

Lists of construction records
Skyscrapers
Lists of tallest buildings